Yeferson Agustín Quintana Alonso (born 19 April 1996) is a Uruguayan professional footballer who plays as a centre-back for Uruguayan Primera División club Defensor Sporting.

Career

Peñarol
Born in Bella Unión, Quintana played in his home town from 2011 to 2013 with Deportivo Tropezón Board. He soon joined the youth academy of Primera División team Peñarol. In September 2015, Quintana earned a temporary promotion to the first team after Gonzalo Viera left the club. In June 2016, Quintana signed his first professional contract with Peñarol.

Quintana appeared for Peñarol's first team for the first time on 16 August 2016 on the bench in their Copa Sudamericana match against Sportivo Luqueño. He made his competitive debut for the club on 3 September 2016 in a Primera División match against Fénix. He came on as a 52nd-minute substitute for Bressan as Peñarol won 2–0.

During the 2017 season, Quintana played 22 matches for Peñarol as he helped lead the club to a league title. He scored his first goal for the club on 10 June 2017 in a 4–1 victory over Rampla Juniors. The following week on 18 June, Quintana scored the winning goal for Peñarol in a 2–1 victory over El Tanque Sisley.

Loan spells
On January 17, 2018, MLS side the San Jose Earthquakes announced that they had signed Quintana to a yearlong loan, with an option to buy. He stated after his arrival in San Jose that he hoped the team would decide to keep him at the season's end.

Quintana made his MLS debut on March 3, 2018, in San Jose's season-opening 3-2 victory over Minnesota United. However, he was substituted in the 54th minute after suffering an injury. He scored his first MLS goal against New York City in a 1-2 loss on March 31, 2018.

On 14 February 2019, Quintana was loaned out again, this time to Cerro Largo for the rest of the year. He made 26 appearances for the team and scored one goal. Returning to Peñarol in the beginning of 2020, he was loaned out for the third time, to Danubio. On 29 September 2020, he moved to Spanish club Racing de Ferrol on loan until 30 June 2021.

Career statistics

References

External links 
 Peñarol Profile.

1996 births
Living people
People from Artigas Department
Association football defenders
Uruguayan footballers
Peñarol players
San Jose Earthquakes players
Cerro Largo F.C. players
Danubio F.C. players
Racing de Ferrol footballers
Defensor Sporting players
Uruguayan Primera División players
Major League Soccer players
Segunda División B players
Uruguayan expatriate footballers
Uruguayan expatriate sportspeople in the United States
Uruguayan expatriate sportspeople in Spain
Expatriate soccer players in the United States
Expatriate footballers in Spain